The C209/A209 Mercedes-Benz CLK-Class is the second generation of the Mercedes-Benz CLK-Class range of mid-size / compact executive coupes produced between 2002 and 2010. The body styles of the range are:

 2-door coupé (C209)
 2-door convertible (A209)

It was replaced by the Mercedes-Benz C207/A207 E-Class in 2010. In some cases, the Mercedes-Benz C205/A205 C-Class also replaced it; with the 43 and 63 AMG versions being the sole example (as replacements for the CLK 55 and CLK 63).

Development and launch 
The C209/A209 CLK is based on the Mercedes W203 C-Class platform, and uses rack-and-pinion steering, instead of the recirculating ball design from the previous generation. It also uses a three-link front suspension, and aluminium rear multi-link suspension. Compared to its predecessor, the second generation CLK is  longer,  wider, and  taller.

At introduction, a 3.2-litre V6, 5.0-litre V8, 5.4-litre V8, and 2.7L inline-5 diesel engine was available, which were all replaced by 2006.

Body styles

Coupé (C209) 
The production version CLK was unveiled at the 2002 Geneva Motor Show.

Convertible (A209) 
Convertible CLK models feature a three-layered electric soft top, that can be operated via the keyfob or at speeds up to 8 km/h (5 mph) in 20 seconds. Convertible models were originally manufactured by Karmann in Osnabrück in 2003, but production was later moved to Bremen, Germany in 2004.

Equipment 
Standard equipment includes antilock brakes, electronic stability control, power seats, and dual-zone climate control. Models were also offered in Elegance and Avantgarde specification. Elegance models feature green-tinted glass, a grey coloured grille, 7-spoke polished 16-inch alloy wheels, and wood interior trim, while Avantgarde models featured blue-tinted glass, a black coloured grille, 5-spoke 18-inch alloy wheels, aluminium interior trim, as well as stiffer springs, thicker anti-roll bars, and a  lower ride height.

In 2005, a Sports edition, based on the Avantgarde specification, was introduced and featured six-spoke 18-inch alloy wheels, cross-drilled brake rotors, and bi-xenon headlights. An AMG Sports package was also available, featuring a restyled front bumper, a spoiler lip on the boot, and 18-inch wheels. The Elegance and Avantgarde models were also updated, now featuring nine-spoke 16-inch wheels, and five spoke 17-inch wheels respectively.

Models

Petrol engines

Diesel engines

Special models

CLK DTM AMG (2004-2006) 

It was a limited edition high-performance version of the CLK, to celebrate the racing version of the CLK winning the 2003 German Touring Car Championship (DTM) season. Only 100 coupés and 80 convertibles were built for the European market only, with the coupé version produced for the 2004 model year, and the convertible version made for the 2006 model year.

CLK 63 AMG Black Series (2007-2009)  

The CLK 63 AMG Black Series is a high-performance version of the CLK 63 AMG coupé, produced between 2007 and 2009. 500 were produced in total worldwide, with 349 headed to the United States and only 120 produced in RHD. Additional features also include a manually adjustable suspension system, a limited-slip differential, larger air intakes, bucket seats, 19-inch alloy wheels, and a spoiler, diffuser, and wider fenders made of carbon fibre.

F1 safety car 

In 2003, the CLK 55 AMG was used as a F1 safety car. The CLK 63 AMG was also used as a F1 safety car for the 2006 and 2007 seasons.

Model year changes

2004 
 Handling improvements in the form of modified axle bearings and more direct steering

2005 facelift 
A facelift was introduced in June 2005. Major changes include:

 Exterior design changes including: redesigned front and rear bumpers, grille with three louvres instead of four, and restyled taillights
 COMAND 2.0 upgraded to DVD-based COMAND-APS system, introducing iPod integration
 Updated center console with improved layout and switches
 New 7G-Tronic automatic transmission replaces the old 5G-Tronic system
 The CLK 240, CLK 320, and CLK 55 AMG are replaced by newer models

2007 
 Introduction of CLK 550 and CLK 63 AMG models
 Introduction of Sports and AMG Sports package

Sales figures 
The following are the sales figures for the CLK in Europe and in the United States:

Motorsports 

The Mercedes-Benz CLK DTM was a race version of the CLK that won the 2003 DTM season.

References 

C209
C209
Cars introduced in 2002
Cars discontinued in 2010
Rear-wheel-drive vehicles
Grand tourers
Coupés
Convertibles